Jean-Charles Valladont (born 20 March 1989) is a French archer. He competed at the 2008 and 2016 Olympics, the latter in which he won a silver medal. He won another silver medal at the 2015 World Cup.

Career
At the 2008 Summer Olympics in Beijing, Valladont finished his ranking round with a total of 656 points, which gave him the 35th seed for the final competition bracket in which he faced Michael Naray in the first round. Naray, who was the 30th seed won the match by 108–106. He was eliminated in the following round by Viktor Ruban who would eventually win the gold medal.

He won the silver medal in the men's recurve event at the 2022 European Indoor Archery Championships held in Laško, Slovenia. He also won the gold medal in the men's team recurve event.

References

External links

 
 
 
 
 

1989 births
Living people
French male archers
Archers at the 2008 Summer Olympics
Archers at the 2016 Summer Olympics
Olympic archers of France
Sportspeople from Besançon
Archers at the 2015 European Games
World Archery Championships medalists
Medalists at the 2016 Summer Olympics
Olympic silver medalists for France
Olympic medalists in archery
World Games gold medalists
Competitors at the 2013 World Games
Archers at the 2019 European Games
European Games gold medalists for France
European Games medalists in archery
World Games medalists in archery
Archers at the 2020 Summer Olympics
Competitors at the 2017 World Games
21st-century French people